The 1985–86 2. Bundesliga season was the twelfth season of the 2. Bundesliga, the second tier of the German football league system.

FC Homburg and SpVgg Blau-Weiß 1890 Berlin were promoted to the Bundesliga while Hertha BSC, SpVgg Bayreuth, Tennis Borussia Berlin and MSV Duisburg were relegated to the Oberliga.

League table
For the 1985–86 season VfL Osnabrück, Tennis Borussia Berlin, Viktoria Aschaffenburg and SpVgg Bayreuth were newly promoted to the 2. Bundesliga from the Oberliga while Arminia Bielefeld, Karlsruher SC and Eintracht Braunschweig had been relegated to the league from the Bundesliga.

Results

Top scorers
The league's top scorers:

References

External links
 2. Bundesliga 1985/1986 at Weltfussball.de 
 1985–86 2. Bundesliga at kicker.de 

1985-86
2
Ger